Jeff Regan, Investigator is a radio detective drama that ran on CBS from July 10, 1948 to December 18, 1948, and again from October 5, 1949 to August 27, 1950. The series is notable for being one of the earliest nationwide programs to feature Jack Webb.

Production
Webb, who had previously starred on the Mutual detective drama, Johnny Madero, Pier 23, played the title character, a private investigator working for Anthony J. Lyon (originally Wilms Herbert, later Herb Butterfield) at the International Detective Bureau. In the first incarnation of the series, Lyon was played by Wilms Herbert, while Webb's future Dragnet co-star, Barton Yarborough, played his co-worker, Joe Canto. This format continued until the end of the year, when Webb left the program. According to writer William Froug, Webb was fired for asking for too much money. Police Lieutenant Sanduci (Jack Petruzzi) served as a foil to Jeff Regan and could be heard on a number of episodes.

The program remained on hiatus for almost a year before being brought back with voice actor Frank Graham portraying Regan. Graham, who was well known both as an announcer and for his versatility, had previously created and starred in his own detective series, The Adventures of Cosmo Jones. Lyon was also recast, with The Jack Benny Program regular Frank Nelson taking over the part. This remained the definitive lineup for the rest of the show's run, although for unknown reasons Paul Dubov filled in for Graham for several weeks.

Cancellation
The second version of Regan remained popular in the ratings and was expected to be renewed for another season. However, Graham committed suicide on September 2, 1950. At the time of his death, five more broadcasts were scheduled for Regan, but they were never completed. Graham had completed an episode scheduled to air the night after he died, but newspaper accounts indicated that CBS chose not to broadcast it. The role of Regan was not recast, resulting in the series ending production permanently.

References

American radio dramas
Fictional private investigators
1940s American radio programs
1948 radio programme debuts
1950s American radio programs
1950 radio programme endings
CBS Radio programs
Detective radio shows